Marilyn Pupo (born November 23, 1950) is a Cuban-born Puerto Rican actress, singer and television show host. She is known for her stint as a television show host at Telemundo Puerto Rico's Noche de Gala alongside Eddie Miro, and for starring in the telenovela "El Idolo", also on that channel, 
alongside Jose Luis Rodriguez, during 1980 and 1981, as well as in other soap operas, such as "Maria Eugenia" and "Ambicion de Poder", where she starred alongside Martin Lantigua.

In 1974, Pupo had a short, special participation in the Mexican telenovela, Mundo de juguete. In 1978, Pupo participated in the Spanish-Panamanian film, "May I Borrow Your Girl Tonight?". In 1983, Pupo starred in the Dominican Republic comedy film, "Guaguasi", which was selected by that country as a prospective representative for the Oscars in the "best foreign language film" category but did not compete.

A noted theatrical actress, Pupo has also participated in more than ten theatrical productions in Puerto Rico, including "El Diario de Anna Frank" (about the life of young Dutch-German writer Anne Frank), "Entre Amigas" and "El Club del Cementerio", the later two for which she received awards by the Puerto Rican Theater Critics' Circle. She also acted, during 2017, in "Titantos" alongside Puerto Rican television reporter Keylla Hernandez, among four other actresses.

She was also the show host of a television show named "Estas Invitado" during the mid 1980s. Pupo has also hosted, alongside Rafael Jose, in the Puerto Rican version of the Muscular Dystrophy Association's telemarathon.

On 20 August, 2022, Pupo will return to theater, in a play named "La Peor Cantante del Mundo" ("The Worst Female Singer in the World"), where she will play the role of Florence Foster Jenkins. In that play, she will share credits with Magali Carrasquillo and Braulio Castillo, hijo, among others.

Personal life 
Pupo was married for six years to Chiqui Soldevila, who died after divorcing her, during 2013 in a car crash in San Francisco, California. She and Soldevila were the parents of son Pedro Soldevila. Pupo also has a daughter named Ana Laura Penedo, who was adopted during her marriage to Eduardo Penedo, a Telemundo Puerto Rico and Teleonce executive who died on March 20, 2021.

See also 
List of Cubans
List of Puerto Ricans

References 

1950 births
Living people
Cuban expatriates in Puerto Rico
Hispanic and Latino American actresses
20th-century Cuban actresses
20th-century Cuban women singers
20th-century Puerto Rican actresses
20th-century Puerto Rican women singers